Pelham's Pillar is a monument dedicated to Charles Anderson-Pelham, 1st Earl of Yarborough who died in 1846.

The Pillar is in Cabourne, West Lindsey on part of the Yarborough estate at Brocklesby, and is a viewing tower built to enable the earls to view the estate. It is said that, when it was built, everything that could be seen from the top belonged to Charles Anderson-Pelham.

The architect was Edward James Willson of Lincoln. The foundation of the pillar was laid by Pelham's son Charles Anderson-Pelham, 2nd Earl of Yarborough, and it was completed by his grandson Charles Anderson-Pelham, 3rd Earl of Yarborough, in 1849. Prince Albert visited the pillar in the year of its completion.

See also
Dunston Pillar
Grimsby Dock Tower

References
Market Rasen before 1901

Monuments and memorials in Lincolnshire
Towers completed in 1849
1849 establishments in England
West Lindsey District